Nuria Iturrioz (born 16 December 1995) is a Spanish professional golfer on the Ladies European Tour and LPGA Tour.

Iturrioz turned professional in 2015 after she finished fourth at the Ladies European Tour Qualifying School Final, and joined the LET in 2016. She won the Lalla Meryem Cup as a rookie and finished 10th on the Order of Merit rankings, but missed out on the LET Rookie of the Year award to Aditi Ashok. She won the Lalla Meryem Cup again in 2019 and won two more tournaments in quick succession including the Omega Dubai Moonlight Classic to finish fourth on the 2019 Ladies European Tour Order of Merit rankings.

Iturrioz finished tied for 72nd at the final stage of the 2017 LPGA Qualifying Tournament to earn membership for the 2018 Symetra Tour season. She received one of two sponsor invites for the 2019 Women's PGA Championship, where she made the cut. At the 2019 LPGA Qualifying Tournament, she tied for 30th to earn membership for the 2020 LPGA Tour season.

Professional wins (4)

Ladies European Tour wins (3)

Symetra Tour wins (1)

Team appearances
Amateur
European Ladies' Team Championship (representing Spain): 2014, 2015

Professional
The Queens (representing Europe): 2016

References

External links

Spanish female golfers
Ladies European Tour golfers
LPGA Tour golfers
Sportspeople from Palma de Mallorca
1995 births
Living people
20th-century Spanish women
21st-century Spanish women